AFE or Afe may refer to:

 Active front end, in variable-frequency drives
 Advanced FLOW engineering (aFe), a manufacturer of high performance automotive parts
 Afe Annang, a political unit of the Annang people of Nigeria
 AfE-Turm/Uni-Turm (English: AfE Tower), a demolished skyscraper in Frankfurt, Germany
 Afrique Football Élite, a football club in Bamako, Mali
 Amniotic fluid embolism, a potentially fatal complication of pregnancy
 Analog front-end, in electronics
 Armed Forces Entertainment, a United States Department of Defense agency
 Assembly of French Citizens Abroad, a French government body
 Association of Spanish Footballers (Spanish: Asociación de Futbolistas Españoles)
 Authorization for expenditure, also known as cost in accounting
 Kake Airport, Alaska, United States, by FAA location identifier
 Putukwam language, by ISO 639-3 language code
 State Railways Administration of Uruguay, Uruguay's government-owned railroad company